Pachomius the Serb, also known as Pachomius Logothetes) was a 15th-century Serbian hagiographer who, after taking monastic vows, was schooled on Mount Athos and mastered the ornate style of medieval Serbian literature. He is credited by the Russian Early Texts Society for the Serbian version of Barlaam and Josaphat from Old Greek.

In the 1450s and 1460s he resided at the Trinity Monastery of St. Sergius north of Moscow. One of his major undertakings was a Russian translation of the New Testament. In about 1470 Archbishop Jonas (Iona) asked him to settle in Novgorod where he prepared a set of the lives of local saints. It has been suggested that The Tale of the Princes of Vladimir was also authored by Pachomius.

Life 

He arrived in Novgorod at the end of the 1430s or beginning of the 1440s, during the archiepiscopate of Evfimy II of Novgorod (1429–1458) and, under Evfimii's aegis, he composed the Life of Varlaam of Khutyn, the founder of the Khutyn Monastery, as well as the "Tale of the Journey of Ioann (Il'ia, Archbishop of Novgorod 1165-1186) on a Devil to Jerusalem." He then travelled to the Troitse-Sergiyeva Lavra north of Moscow, where he composed the Life of Sergei of Radonezh, the founder of that monastery.  He returned to Novgorod under Archbishop Iona (1458–1470) and composed the Lives of several Novgorodian bishop-saints, including those of Il'ia (Ioann) and Evfimii II.  He later composed the Life of Moisei, Archbishop of Novgorod sometime shortly after 1484.  He died sometime thereafter.

Works 

Pachomius is believed to have written eleven saint's lives (zhitie), including those of Metropolitan Peter of Moscow, Stephen of Perm, Ilia (Ioann) of Novgorod, Moses of Novgorod, Euthymius II of Novgorod, Jonah of Novgorod, Prince Michael of Chernigov, Barlaam of Khutyn, Sergius of Radonezh, and others.  He also wrote fourteen services, including those for Evfimii II, The Mother of God of the Sign in Novgorod, Metropolitan Alexius of Moscow, Anthony of Kiev, and Metropolitan Jonah of Moscow.

Legacy
A Serbian Orthodox Church monastery is named after him in Greenfield, Missouri.

See also
 Lazar of Hilandar (also known as Lazar the Serb)
 Teodosije the Hilandarian (1246-1328), one of the most important Serbian writers in the Middle Ages
 Elder Grigorije (fl. 1310-1355), builder of Saint Archangels Monastery
 Antonije Bagaš (fl. 1356-1366), bought and restored the Agiou Pavlou monastery
 Lazar the Hilandarian (fl. 1404), the first known Serbian and Russian watchmaker
 Elder Siluan
 Miroslav Gospel
 Gabriel the Hilandarian
 Constantine of Kostenets
 Cyprian, Metropolitan of Kiev and All Rus'
 Gregory Tsamblak
 Isaija the Monk
 Kir Stefan the Serb
 Grigorije of Gornjak
 Stanislav of Lesnovo
 Hieromonk Pahomije
 Atanasije (scribe)
 Rajčin Sudić
 Dimitar of Kratovo
 Nicodemus of Tismana
 Marko Pećki
 Lav Anikita Filolog

References

15th-century Serbian writers
Medieval Serbian Orthodox clergy
Eastern Orthodox monks
Medieval Athos
People from medieval Novgorod
Hagiographers
Eastern Orthodox Christians from Serbia
Russian people of Serbian descent
Medieval European scribes
1484 deaths
People associated with Mount Athos